Rajah Kirby Caruth (born June 11, 2002) is an American professional stock car racing driver. He competes full-time in the NASCAR Craftsman Truck Series, driving the No. 24 Chevrolet Silverado for GMS Racing and part-time in the NASCAR Xfinity Series, driving the No. 45 Chevrolet Camaro for Alpha Prime Racing.

Caruth is one of the five African-American drivers who are currently competing in NASCAR, alongside Bubba Wallace, Jesse Iwuji, Blake Lothian, and Armani Williams.

Racing career

Early career
Rajah started his racing career at age 16, driving in the virtual 2018 eNASCAR Ignite Series on iRacing. Rajah was able to catch the attention of the NASCAR Drive for Diversity Program, which resulted in him having a shot at the 2019 Bojangles' Southern Shootout at Charlotte Motor Speedway in the legend cars category. Rajah ended his rookie season getting two top 10s, and ending up 13th in the Semi-pro points. In 2020, Caruth moved up to the NASCAR Advance Auto Parts Weekly Series, where he won his first career late model race at Greenville-Pickens Speedway, and ending the rest of the season with 3 top 5s and 9 top 10s in a total of 19 late model starts. In 2021, Caruth returned to the NASCAR Advance Auto Parts Weekly Series, and got his second and third late model win after winning both Hickory Motor Speedway late-model features. On May 1, 2021, Caruth won at the Tri-County Motor Speedway, his fourth overall late model win.

ARCA Menards Series East
On February 3, 2021, Caruth announced that he will run full-time in the ARCA Menards Series East for Rev Racing, and will compete for Rookie of the Year honors. Caruth was able to finish off the season with 2 top 5s, 3 top 10s, and 3 top 15s, ending up third in the standings. He made a one off start in the 2022 General Tire 125, starting 5th and finishing 4th. He is expected to run three more races in the 2022 season, which are all combination races with the main series.

ARCA Menards Series
On July 23, 2021, Rev Racing announced on Twitter that Caruth and teammate Nick Sanchez will drive in the 2021 Shore Lunch 150 at Iowa Speedway, which will be Caruth's first ARCA Menards Series start. Caruth started 12th and finished 9th. On August 30, 2021, Caruth announced that he will drive full time in the 2022 ARCA Menards Series season with Rev Racing. He earned his best career finish at the 2022 Dutch Boy 150, finishing 2nd. After earning eight top fives and fourteen top tens throughout the season, he finished 3rd in the final standings.

ARCA Menards Series West
Caruth made his ARCA Menards Series West start in the 2021 Arizona Lottery 100, where he started and finished the race in 8th. He made his second start in the 2022 General Tire 150, driving in the paired event with the main series. He started 7th and finished 4th.

Xfinity Series

2022
On August 30, 2021, along with the ARCA announcement, Tommy Joe Martins and Caesar Bacarella announced the formation of Alpha Prime Racing, that will compete in the 2022 NASCAR Xfinity Series season, with Caruth set as one of the drivers for the team. On April 2, 2022, Caruth made his Xfinity Series debut at Richmond Raceway in the 44. He started 22nd and finish 24th. He made his second start in the 2022 A-GAME 200, where he qualified an impressive 15th. Suspension issues ended Caruth's race on lap 58, and he finished dead last. At the Pocono race, Caruth was involved in a vicious wreck with Alex Labbé on the first lap, resulting in another last place finish. At Kansas, Caruth switched to the No. 45 car, sponsored by iRacing. He finished 25th after the race ended after stage 2 due to inclement weather. He earned his first top 20 finish at Las Vegas, after finishing 20th in the race. At Martinsville, Caruth dodged numerous wrecks and finished 12th, earning his best career finish in the Xfinity Series. After the race, he had an altercation with Jeb Burton.

2023
On January 27, 2023, Caruth announced that he will return to Alpha Prime Racing for the 2023 season, running another partial schedule.

Craftsman Truck Series

2022
On May 31, 2022, it was announced that Caruth would make his NASCAR Camping World Truck Series debut at the World Wide Technology Raceway for Spire Motorsports. In his first start, Caruth initially scored in 10th, after the caution came out on the final lap. He was later scored in the 11th spot. At Richmond, Caruth started 28th due to a bad qualifying run. He only moved up a few positions, and would finish 25th, four laps down. At Bristol, Caruth was involved in an accident with Josh Reaume on lap 34, eventually retiring from the race ten laps later.

2023
On December 1, 2022, TobyChristie.com reported that Caruth will drive full-time in the Truck Series in 2023, driving the No. 24 truck for GMS Racing. It was also reported that The Wendell Scott Foundation will sponsor Caruth for part of his 2023 season. On December 6, it was officially confirmed that Caruth will drive for GMS Racing in 2023.

Personal life
Caruth was born in Atlanta, Georgia to a Vincentian father and a Vincentian-Barbadian mother, but was raised in Brooklyn, New York, and Washington, D.C.. In June 2020, he was the subject of a NASCAR documentary, "Through the Fences," which aired on Tempo Networks. It talks about Caruth's racing career and how he got accepted into the NASCAR Drive for Diversity program. He was also featured in an episode of "The Family Business" on BET+ in July. He graduated from the School Without Walls High School in 2020, and is currently a junior at Winston-Salem State University, where he is a Motorsport management major. On December 27, 2022, it was announced that Caruth would join Richard Petty on NASCAR's float in the 2023 Rose Parade.

Motorsports career results

Stock car career summary 

† As Caruth was a guest driver, he was ineligible for championship points.

NASCAR
(key) (Bold – Pole position awarded by qualifying time. Italics – Pole position earned by points standings or practice time. * – Most laps led.)

Xfinity Series

Craftsman Truck Series

 Season still in progress
 Ineligible for series points

ARCA Menards Series
(key) (Bold – Pole position awarded by qualifying time. Italics – Pole position earned by points standings or practice time. * – Most laps led. ** – All laps led.)

ARCA Menards Series East

ARCA Menards Series West

References

External links
 
 Official profile at GMS Racing
 

Living people
2002 births
Racing drivers from Atlanta
Racing drivers from Georgia (U.S. state)
African-American racing drivers
NASCAR drivers
ARCA Menards Series drivers
Sportspeople from Georgia (U.S. state)